Muhammad Moin Aamir Pirzada is a member of Provincial Assembly of sindh and was the MPA he is 48 years old

Early life and education
He was born on 9 August 1972 in Karachi.

He has a degree of Bachelors of Arts from Balochistan University and a degree of Master of Arts in Political Science from Karachi University.

Political career

He was elected to the Provincial Assembly of Sindh as a candidate of Mutahida Quami Movement from Constituency PS-125 KARACHI-XXXVII in 2013 Pakistani general election.

References

Living people
Sindh MPAs 2013–2018
1972 births
Muttahida Qaumi Movement politicians